Bruzzone is an Italian surname. Notable people with the surname include:

Mario Bruzzone (1887–1940), Italian sailor
Nicolás Bruzzone (born 1985), Argentine rugby sevens player
Tiziano Bruzzone (born 1984), Italian footballer

Italian-language surnames